The Privy Council of Scotland ( — 1 May 1708) was a body that advised the Scottish monarch. In the range of its functions the council was often more important than the Estates in the running the country. Its registers include a wide range of material on the political, administrative, economic and social affairs of the Kingdom of Scotland. The council supervised the administration of the law, regulated trade and shipping, took emergency measures against the plague, granted licences to travel, administered oaths of allegiance, banished beggars and gypsies, dealt with witches, recusants, Covenanters and Jacobites and tackled the problem of lawlessness in the Highlands and the Borders.

History

Like the Parliament, the council was a development of the King's Council. The King's Council, or curia regis, was the court of the monarch surrounded by his royal officers and others upon whom he relied for advice. It is known to have existed in the thirteenth century, if not earlier, but has left little trace of its activities.

By the later fifteenth century the council had advisory, executive and judicial functions though surviving records are mainly confined to the last. It is at this period that the 'secret' or privy council makes its formal appearance when, in February 1490, parliament elected 2 bishops, an abbot or prior, 6 barons and 8 royal officers to form the king's council .

The Lords of Secret Council, as they were known, were part of the general body of Lords of Council, like the Lords of Session and Lords Auditors of Exchequer. After 1532 much of the judicial business was transferred to the newly founded College of Justice, the later Court of Session. The council met regularly and was particularly active during periods of a monarch's minority. A separate register of the privy council appears in 1545 and probably marks the point at which the secret council split off from its parent body.

After 1603 James VI was able to boast to the English Parliament that he governed Scotland with my pen. The council received his written instructions and executed his will. This style of government, continued by his grandsons Charles II and James VII, was disrupted during the reign of Charles I by the Covenanters and the Cromwellian occupation. There are gaps in the register during the upheavals of 1638–41 when the council was largely displaced by an alternative administration set up by the Covenanters and during the Cromwellian period, the council ceased to act at all.

After the restoration of the monarchy in 1660, Charles II nominated his own privy councillors and set up a council in London through which he directed affairs in Edinburgh, a situation that continued after the Glorious Revolution of 1688–9. The council survived the Act of Union but for one year only. It was abolished on 1 May 1708 by the Parliament of Great Britain and thereafter there was one Privy Council of Great Britain sitting in London.

Until 1707, the Privy Council met in what is now the West Drawing Room at the Palace of Holyroodhouse in Edinburgh. It was called the Council Chamber in the 17th century.

The Register of the Privy Council of Scotland (1545–1689) was edited and published between 1877 and 1970 by John Hill Burton, David Masson, Peter Hume Brown and Henry Macleod Paton.

Lord President of the Privy Council
The President of the Privy Council was one of the Great Officers of State in Scotland.  The Lord Chancellor presided over the Council ex officio, but in 1610 James VI decreed that the President of the College of Justice should preside in the Chancellor's absence, and by 1619 the additional title of President of the Privy Council had been added. The two presidencies were separated in 1626 as part of Charles I's reorganisation of the Privy Council and Court of Session. The Lord President of the council was accorded precedence as one of the King's chief officers in 1661, but appeared in the Estates of Parliament only intermittently.
1625: The 4th Earl of Montrose
1649: The 1st Earl of Loudoun
1660: The 7th Earl of Rothes
1663: The 2nd Earl of Tweeddale
1672: The 1st Duke of Lauderdale
1681: Sir George Gordon of Haddo, 3rd Bt., later created Earl of Aberdeen
1682: The 3rd Marquess of Montrose
1686: The 1st Duke of Queensberry (questioned)
1689: The 18th Earl of Crawford and 2nd Earl of Lindsay
1692: The 2nd Earl of Annandale and Hartfell (later created 1st Marquess of Annandale)
1695: The 1st Earl of Melville
1702: The 1st Marquess of Annandale
1704: The 4th Marquess of Montrose
1705: The 1st Marquess of Annandale
1706: The 4th Marquess of Montrose (later created 1st Duke of Montrose)
office abolished in 1708

See also
Privy Council
 :Category:Members of the Privy Council of Scotland

External links 

The Register of the Privy Council of Scotland (edited and abridged) – 2nd Series (incomplete)

Other links

 
Lists of Scottish people
1708 disestablishments in Great Britain
1708 disestablishments in Scotland